Connecticut's 144th House of Representatives district elects one member of the Connecticut House of Representatives. It encompasses parts of Stamford and has been represented by Democrat Hubert Douglas Delany since 2022.

Recent elections

2022

2022 special

2020

2018

2016

2014

2012

References

144